Hard Attack is the debut album by MX-80 Sound, released in 1977 by Island Records. It was re-released by Atavistic Records in 1995, combined with the 1976 EP Big Hits.

Reception 

According to Trouser Press, the album was well received by the critics who reviewed it when it was released. AllMusic writes that the album "[finds] the band balanced in some sort of weird zone where punk, art metal, and a drawling sort of humor could all happily coexist."

Track listing

Personnel

 MX-80 Sound

 Bruce Anderson – guitar, backing vocals
 Dale Sophiea – bass, backing vocals
 Rich Stim – vocals, saxophone, organ, rhythm guitar

 Additional musicians and technical

 Mark Bingham – production, backing vocals
 Mark Hood – engineering
 Kim Torgerson – sleeve photography

References

External links 
 

1977 debut albums
MX-80 albums